Maggie Xiaoyan Cheng is an applied mathematician and computer scientist who works as a professor of applied mathematics at the Illinois Institute of Technology, where she directs the Center for Interdisciplinary Scientific Computation. Her research interests include cyber security and Machine Learning.

Education and career
Cheng has a bachelor's and master's degree from the Beijing University of Aeronautics and Astronautics. She completed a Ph.D. in computer science in 2003 from the University of Minnesota.

After completing her doctorate, she became an assistant professor of computer science at the Missouri University of Science and Technology. She moved to the Martin Tuchman School of Management of the New Jersey Institute of Technology in 2016, and moved to the Illinois Institute of Technology in 2018,  and she was promoted to full professor in 2020.

References

External links
Home page

Year of birth missing (living people)
Living people
21st-century American mathematicians
American women mathematicians
American computer scientists
Chinese computer scientists
Chinese mathematicians
Chinese women mathematicians
Women computer scientists
Applied mathematicians
Beihang University alumni
University of Minnesota College of Science and Engineering alumni
Missouri University of Science and Technology faculty
New Jersey Institute of Technology faculty
Illinois Institute of Technology faculty
21st-century American women